Title 21 is the portion of the Code of Federal Regulations that governs food and drugs within the United States for the Food and Drug Administration (FDA), the Drug Enforcement Administration (DEA), and the Office of National Drug Control Policy (ONDCP).

It is divided into three chapters:
 Chapter I — Food and Drug Administration
 Chapter II — Drug Enforcement Administration
 Chapter III — Office of National Drug Control Policy

Chapter I 
Most of the Chapter I regulations are based on the Federal Food, Drug, and Cosmetic Act.

Notable sections:

 11 — electronic records and electronic signature related
 50 Protection of human subjects in clinical trials
 54 Financial disclosure by clinical investigators 
 56 Institutional review boards that oversee clinical trials
 58 Good laboratory practices (GLP) for nonclinical studies

The 100 series are regulations pertaining to food:

 101, especially 101.9 — Nutrition facts label related
 (c)(2)(ii) — Requirement to include trans fat values
 (c)(8)(iv) — Vitamin and mineral values
 106-107 requirements for infant formula
 110 et seq. cGMPs for food products
 111 et seq. cGMPs for dietary supplements
 170 food additives
 190 dietary supplements

The 200 and 300 series are regulations pertaining to pharmaceuticals :

 202-203 Drug advertising and marketing
 210 et seq. cGMPs for pharmaceuticals
 310 et seq. Requirements for new drugs
 328 et seq. Specific requirements for over-the-counter (OTC) drugs.

The 500 series are regulations for animal feeds and animal medications:

 510 et seq. New animal drugs
 556 Tolerances for residues of drugs in food animals

The 600 series covers biological products (e.g. vaccines, blood):

 601 Licensing under section 351 of the Public Health Service Act
 606 et seq. cGMPs for human blood and blood products

The 700 series includes the limited regulations on cosmetics:

 701 Labeling requirements

The 800 series are for medical devices:

 803 Medical device reporting
 814 Premarket approval of medical devices 
 820 et seq. Quality system regulations (analogous to cGMP, but structured like ISO) 
 860 et seq. Listing of specific approved devices and how they are classified

The 900 series covers mammography quality requirements enforced by CDRH.

The 1000 series covers radiation-emitting device (e.g. cell phones, lasers, x-ray generators); requirements enforced by the Center for Devices and Radiological Health. It also talks about the FDA citizen petition.

The 1100 series includes updated rules deeming items that statutorily come under the definition of "tobacco product" to be subject to the Federal Food, Drug, and Cosmetic Act as amended by the Tobacco Control Act. The items affected include E-cigarettes, Hookah tobacco, and pipe tobacco.

The 1200 series consists of rules primarily based in laws other than the Food, Drug, and Cosmetic Act:

 1240 Rules promulgated under 361 of the Public Health Service Act on interstate control of communicable disease, such as:
 Requirements for pasteurization of milk
 Interstate shipment of turtles as pets.
 Interstate shipment of African rodents that may carry monkeypox.
 Sanitation on interstate conveyances (i.e. airplanes and ships)
 1271 Requirements for human cells, tissues, and cellular and tissue-based products (i.e. the cGTPs).

Chapter II 
Notable sections:

 1308 — Schedules of controlled substances
 1308.03(a) — Administrative Controlled Substances Code Number
 1308.11 — List of Schedule I drugs
 1308.12 — List of Schedule II drugs
 1308.13 — List of Schedule III drugs
 1308.14 — List of Schedule IV drugs
 1308.15 — List of Schedule V drugs

See also 
 Title 21 of the United States Code - Food and Drugs
 EudraLex (medicinal products in the European Union)

References

External links 
 Title 21 of the Code of Federal Regulations (current "Electronic CFR")

 21
Drug control law in the United States
Food law
Regulation of medical devices